Southend-on-Sea Athletic Club is an athletics club based in Essex. 
The club has one track, which is based at Southend Leisure and Tennis Centre.

The formation of Southend-on-Sea Athletic Club took place over 100 years ago in 1905 when it was known as Southend Harriers. Within the first decade the club had become "A leading club in athletics". In 2005 the club celebrated their centenary and in the same year the Senior Men were promoted to the British Athletic League.  The club is based at Southend Leisure and Tennis Centre, Garon Park, where it moved to in 1994 from its old home of Southchurch Park [formerly Coronation Park] and in 2015 celebrated the opening of their Club House with a picture-window view of the athletic arena. The Leisure Centre is also home to many other sports such as: cricket, indoor and outdoor tennis + football, and golf.  
The athletic club is part of a number of clubs in Essex:
Affiliated to:
UK Athletics
England Athletics
Essex County Athletic Association

External links
Official Club Website
Garon Park Athletics Track
Southend Leisure and Tennis website

Athletics in Essex
Athletics clubs in England
1905 establishments in England
Sports clubs in Essex
Sports clubs in Southend-on-Sea
Sports clubs established in 1905